The Clift Building in Salt Lake City, Utah, is an 8-story commercial office building designed by James L. Chesebro and constructed by the Larsen-Sampson Company in 1919. Chesebro included a theater accessed from the Main Street exposure. The building features a glazed terracotta facade associated with the Second Renaissance Revival style.

Virtue (Butcher) Clift (March 20, 1837-October 23, 1925) constructed the Clift Building in honor of her late husband, Francis D. Clift (December 7, 1832-December 21, 1913). The Clifts owned real estate in Salt Lake City, and they had operated a residential hotel, the Clift House, at the future site of the Clift Building.

Francis D. Clift was an 1851 pioneer, opening a mercantile business on Main Street and later investing in the Emma Silver Mine.

References

External links
 
 The Historic Clift Building
 Clift Building website

Further reading
 Off Broadway Theatre, Cinema Treasures

		
National Register of Historic Places in Salt Lake City
Second Renaissance Revival architecture
Buildings and structures completed in 1919